Krone (the cognate of Crown) may refer to:

General
 Crown (headgear)
 ADC KRONE & The KRONE Group in ADC Telecommunications
 KRONE LSA-PLUS, a popular telecommunications connector, or krone tool
 Krone an der Brahe, the German name for Koronowo, Poland
 Diu Crône, a medieval poem
 Kronen Zeitung, an Austrian tabloid
 The Krone Group, manufacturer 
 Krone (mountain), in the Alps
 Bernard Krone Holding, a German company

Name
 Fred Krone (1930–2010), American actor and stuntman
 Heinrich Krone (1895-1989), German politician
 Julie Krone, American jockey
 Sigismund Ernst Richard Krone (1861 – 1917), German naturalist
 Hermann Krone (1827 – 1916), German photographer
 Roger Krone, CEO of Leidos

Currency
 Named by European monarchies:
 Scandinavia:
 Danish krone
Krone (Danish coin)
 Norwegian krone
 Swedish krona
 Austro-Hungarian krone
 Faroese króna
 Fiume krone
 Yugoslav krone
 Named by republics:
 Czech koruna
 Estonian kroon
 Icelandic króna
 Slovak koruna

See also
 Krona (disambiguation)
 Koruna (disambiguation)
 Crown (British coin)
 Crown (currency)
 Crone, a stock character in folklore and fairy tale, an old woman
 Lower Croan, a farmstead in Cornwall, England, UK
 Crohn's disease, a type of inflammatory bowel disease